
Year 371 (CCCLXXI) was a common year starting on Saturday (link will display the full calendar) of the Julian calendar. At the time, it was known as the Year of the Consulship of Augustus and Petronius (or, less frequently, year 1124 Ab urbe condita). The denomination 371 for this year has been used since the early medieval period, when the Anno Domini calendar era became the prevalent method in Europe for naming years.

Events 
 By place 

 Roman Empire 
 The fortified cities of the Danube, with Sirmium (Pannonia) at the forefront, contribute to stop an invasion of the Quadi.

 Persia 
 The neo-Persian Empire attains the zenith of its power under King Shapur II, as the Romans renew their war against Persia. Hostilities will continue for the next 5 years.

 Asia 
 Baekje forces storm the Goguryeo capital in P'yongyang (Korea).
 Sosurim becomes king of Goguryeo.

 By topic 

 Art and Science 
 Roman poet Ausonius writes of a voyage on the Rhine and the Moselle, in his work 'Mosella'.

 Religion
 Augustine of Hippo, age 17, travels to Carthage, to continue his education in rhetoric.
 Martin of Tours becomes bishop of Tours (approximate date).

Births 
 Dao Wu Di, Chines emperor of Northern Wei (d. 409)
 Sengrui, Chinese Buddhist monk and scholar (d. 438)
 Valentinian II, Roman consul and emperor (d. 392)

Deaths 
 April 12 – Zeno of Verona, Christian bishop and martyr 
 August 1 – Eusebius of Vercelli, Christian bishop (b. 283)
 Gogugwon, king of Goguryeo (Korea)
 Hilarion, Syrian anchorite and saint (b. 291)
 Lucifer Calaritanus, founder of the Luciferian sect (approximate date)

References